Nazikeda Kadın may refer to:
 Nazikeda Kadın (wife of Abdul Hamid II)
 Nazikeda Kadın (wife of Mehmed VI)